Paw Paw Lake or variants is the name of several lakes in the United States:

The largest and best known Paw Paw Lake is Paw Paw Lake in Berrien County, Michigan. The settlements near the lake are: Paw Paw Lake, Michigan and Little Paw Paw Lake, Michigan.

Other U.S. lakes with the name:
 Paw Paw Lake (Hillsdale County, Michigan) lake
 Paw Paw Lake (Kalamazoo County, Michigan) lake
 Paw Paw Lake (Ohio) reservoir
 Little Paw Paw Lake lake
 Lake Paw Paw, Texas, reservoir
 Papaw Lake, Louisiana, lake
 Paw-Paw Lake, Missouri, reservoir

See also 

 Paw Paw (disambiguation)

References

Paw Paw